Lidiya Nikolayevna Smirnova (1915  —  2007) was a Soviet and Russian theater and film actress. People's Artist of USSR (1974). The winner of the Stalin Prize of the third degree (1951). Member of the Communist Party of the Soviet Union since 1952.

Selected filmography
  The New Moscow (1938) as a girl
  My Love (1940) as Shura
 The Guy from Our Town (1942) as Varya Burmina (Lukonina)
 Michman Panin (1960) as wife  Grigoriev's
 Silence (1963) as Seraphima Ignatyevna Bykova
 Welcome, or No Trespassing (1964) as doctor
 Balzaminov's Marriage (1964) as Matchmaker
 Village Detective (1968) as Yevdokia Mironovna Pronina, Rural shop clerk
 As Ilf and Petrov rode a tram (1972) as handler and artistic director of circus
 Shelter Comedians (1995) as Nelly Yevgenievna

References

External links

 Лидия Смирнова, биография в изложении Фёдора Раззакова

1915 births
2007 deaths
Burials at Vvedenskoye Cemetery
People from Tatarstan
People from Menzelinsky Uyezd
Communist Party of the Soviet Union members
Soviet film actresses
Russian film actresses
20th-century Russian actresses
People's Artists of the USSR
People's Artists of the RSFSR
Honored Artists of the RSFSR
Stalin Prize winners
Recipients of the Order of the Red Banner of Labour
Recipients of the Order "For Merit to the Fatherland", 3rd class
Recipients of the Order "For Merit to the Fatherland", 4th class